Samuel Evans Ewing, Jr. (July 27, 1906 – April 6, 1981) was an American field hockey player who competed in the 1932 Summer Olympics and 1936 Summer Olympics.

He was born in Bryn Mawr, Pennsylvania and died in Delray Beach, Florida.

In 1932 he was a member of the American field hockey team, which won the bronze medal. He played one match as back.

Four years later he was a member of the American field hockey team, which lost all three matches in the preliminary round and did not advance. He played two matches as back.

See also
List of Princeton University Olympians

External links
 
profile

1906 births
1981 deaths
American male field hockey players
Field hockey players at the 1932 Summer Olympics
Field hockey players at the 1936 Summer Olympics
Olympic bronze medalists for the United States in field hockey
Medalists at the 1932 Summer Olympics